John Edmund Kerrich (1903–1985) was a mathematician noted for a series of experiments in probability which he conducted while interned in Nazi-occupied Denmark in the 1940s.

Biography
John Kerrich was born in Norfolk, England and grew up in South Africa. He was educated there and in the UK (First class Honours in Mathematics & MSc Astronomy, University of the Witwatersrand; Diploma in Actuarial Mathematics, University of Edinburgh).

He was appointed lecturer in mathematics in 1929, and senior lecturer six years later. In April 1940, while visiting in-laws in Copenhagen, Kerrich was caught up in the Nazi invasion and interned in Hald Ege, Viborg, Midtjylland. While there he conducted simple experiments using coins and ping-pong balls to demonstrate the empirical validity of a number of fundamental laws of probability.

On his release after the end of the Second World War, Kerrich published an account of his experiments in a short book entitled An Experimental Introduction to the Theory of Probability. Originally published in Denmark, the book was later reprinted by the University of Witwatersrand Press.

In 1957, Kerrich was appointed Foundation Professor of Statistics at the University of Witwatersrand and retired in 1971. He was married with two sons.

Experiments in empirical probability
During his internment, Kerrich worked with fellow internee Eric Christensen. The most famous was a demonstration of Jacob Bernoulli's famous Law of Large Numbers using a coin which they tossed 10,000 times. By recording the number of heads obtained as the trials continued, Kerrich was able to demonstrate that the proportion of heads obtained asymptotically approached the theoretical value of 50 percent (the precise number obtained was 5,067, which is 1.34 standard deviations above the mean for a "fair" coin thrown that many times).

Kerrich and Christensen also performed experiments using a "biased coin", made from a wooden disk partly coated in lead, to show that it too tended towards a stable asymptotic state with probability of approximately 70 percent.

In addition, the pair used ping-pong balls to demonstrate Bayes's theorem.

Until the advent of computer simulations, Kerrich's study, published in 1946, was widely cited as evidence of the asymptotic nature of probability. It is still regarded as a classic study in empirical mathematics.
2,000 of their fair coin flip results are given by the following table, with 1 representing heads and 0 representing tails.

References

External links
 Newsletter of the South African Statistical Association that describes Kerrich biography, as the second president of the association.
 A Brief History of The Department of Statistics at the University of the Witwatersrand, that was founded with Kerrich as its head
 Stack Exchange Thread about Kerrich's coin flip data, 2015.

1903 births
1985 deaths
20th-century British mathematicians
Alumni of St John's College (Johannesburg)
Academic staff of the University of the Witwatersrand
University of the Witwatersrand alumni
English statisticians